The Dubai Open, styled DUBAi Open, was a golf tournament on the Asian Tour. It was played just once, in December 2014 at The Els Club in Dubai Sports City, Dubai, UAE. The purse was US$500,000 with a first prize of $90,000. The event was promoted and organised by "Golf in Dubai" and was the Asian Tour's final event in 2014.

Arjun Atwal won the event. Playing in the final group with Wang Jeung-hun, Atwal was one behind playing the last hole but he got a birdie 4 while Wang took 6, turning a one shot deficit into a one shot victory.

Winners

References

External links

Coverage on the Asian Tour's official site
"golf in DUBAi" site

Former Asian Tour events
Golf tournaments in the United Arab Emirates
Sports competitions in Dubai
Recurring sporting events established in 2014
Winter events in the United Arab Emirates
December 2014 sports events in Asia